Warhawk, released as  in Japan, is a futuristic arcade-style combat flight game for the Sony PlayStation console, developed by SingleTrac and published by Sony Computer Entertainment. It was originally released on November 10, 1995 in North America and a month later in Europe. It was later re-released as part of Sony's Greatest Hits line-up.

A Windows version slated for release in 1996 was cancelled.

A multiplayer-only remake of the same name has been developed by Incognito Entertainment; it was released on Blu-ray Disc and as a digital download for the PlayStation 3 on August 28, 2007.

Gameplay
Warhawk is a vehicle simulation game built around a futuristic VTOL craft. The player maneuvers with 360 degrees of flight control through six levels. Weapons include fire-off lock-ons, rockets, multi-fire swarmers, and plasma cannons. The game has no multiplayer capabilities and does not feature DualShock or analog controller support.

There are no saving or loading features. Instead, a password is presented each time a level is completed. The game ends after its six levels are completed, or when the player's craft can no longer fly. This occurs if the craft takes heavy damage, gets stuck in narrow places or the player ejects from their craft. The craft is teleported to base, repaired, and sent back to the stage for the first two times this happens; on the third time, the game ends.

Enemies in the game vary from being tanks and aircraft to massive fixed gun emplacements and futuristic robots. In certain areas of the game, enemies continuously respawn to challenge the player until they complete the mission objective. A version of the Warhawk craft itself is the final boss in Twisted Metal: Black.

Plot
The plot of the game centers around a megalomaniac named Kreel who has become a global threat and is threatening various nations with his seemingly unstoppable armies. Players take the role of two pilots named 'Hatch' and 'Walker', who are part of an international force devoted to fighting Kreel and his varied minions. As the campaign progresses, the source of Kreel's power is revealed to be Red Mercury, which provides his forces with their nigh-invulnerability.

The game has various endings depending on what actions the player takes during the final battle, or if the player loses all lives. These include a costly nuclear war, Kreel choking to death on a chicken bone, a happy ending selling "I survived the Red Mercury war" baseball caps, both pilots being served as the main course at Kreel's grand victory ceremony, or Hatch being brainwashed by the Red Mercury and becoming Kreel's willing servant and destroying the mothership and remaining planetary defense forces.

Development
The game was announced at E3 1995. Associate producer/designer Mike Giam explained how the game's basic concept was formed: "We looked at shooters like After Burner and StarFox, and we juxtaposed their arcade feeling with the freedom of a computer flight sim".

Reception

Warhawk was released to overwhelmingly positive reviews. Critics lauded the precise controls, music, graphics, sound effects, and most especially the freedom and variety afforded by the open 3D world and complex flight controls, though some felt the game was too short.

See also
Warhawk (2007 video game)

References

External links
Warhawk at GameSpot

Warhawk review at Gaming Target

1995 video games
Cancelled Windows games
PlayStation (console) games
PlayStation Network games
Sony Interactive Entertainment games
Video games developed in the United States
Warhawk (franchise)
Single-player video games